Phestilla melanobrachia is a species of sea slug, an aeolid nudibranch, a marine gastropod mollusk in the family Trinchesiidae.

There are two known colour forms of Phestilla melanobrachia, black and orange. Both of these feed on corals in the family Dendrophylliidae  and have been found to be genetically identical.

Distribution
This species was described from the Philippines. It has been reported from Hong Kong and Japan to Malaysia and East to Australia.

References 

Trinchesiidae
Gastropods described in 1874